John Darwell (born 1955) is a British photographer.

Life and career
Darwell was born in Bolton, Lancashire, in 1955. He has a BA in photography from Manchester Polytechnic, and a PhD from the University of Sunderland. (His thesis was titled A Black Dog Came Calling: A Visualisation of Depression through Contemporary Photography.) He is a Reader in photography at the University of Cumbria.

As a photographer, Darwell "roots himself in neglected landscapes". His early work, published in Working Lives and The Big Ditch, was in black and white, but he moved to colour soon thereafter and has not used black and white since.

Jimmy Jock, Albert and the Six Sided Clock (published in 1993) shows the Liverpool docklands at a time when "the amount of cargo passing through the docks" was higher than ever before, but when, thanks to mechanization, everything was run by fewer than 600 men,  down from over 20,000.

For three weeks in late 1999, Darwell photographed within the Chernobyl Exclusion Zone: Pripyat, numerous villages, a landfill site, and people continuing to live within the Zone. This resulted in an exhibition and book titled Legacy.

The first pyre intended to check the British outbreak of foot-and-mouth disease in early 2001 took place very close to Darwell's house in Cumbria. Darwell devoted a year to photographing this and its aftermath; the resulting book, Dark Days, "catalogues the destruction that consumed local farming communities and shut Cumbria off from the outside world".

DDSBs: Discarded Dog Sh*t Bags shows "a typology of discarded plastic bags containing dog muck", photographs Darwell presents "as evidence of our half-hearted commitment to the ecological cause".

Books by Darwell
Working Lives. Stockport, Ches.: Stockport Museums and Gallery Service, 1986. . With a foreword by John Baker, an introduction by Frank Galvin, and additional photographs from the Stockport Museum archive.
The Big Ditch: The Manchester Ship Canal Seen through the Camera of John Darwell. Chorley, Lancs: Countryside Publications, 1987. . Photographs of the Manchester Ship Canal.
Jimmy Jock, Albert and the Six Sided Clock. Manchester: Cornerhouse, 1993. . Photographs of the Port of Liverpool.
Legacy: Photographs inside the Chernobyl Exclusion Zone. Stockport: Dewi Lewis, 2001. .
Dark Days. Stockport: Dewi Lewis, 2007. . With essays by Liz Wells, Roger Breeze, David Black and Alison Nordström.
Committed to Memory. Carlisle, Cumbria: Tullie House Museum and Art Gallery, 2007. . With an introduction by Paul Herrmann and an essay by Simon Grennan.
DDSBs: Discarded Dog Sh*t Bags. Self-published / mynewtpress, 2013. Edition of 200 copies. `

Booklets and zines by Darwell
(h)arris: Images from the Western Isles. Democratic Book no. 9. Cologne: Democratic Books, 2004. A PDF that is freely downloadable from the publisher's website.
Sheffield: Tinsley Viaduct. Southport, Merseyside: Café Royal Books, 2013.
Sheffield: Meadowhall, Hyde Park, Ponds Forge. Southport, Merseyside: Café Royal Books, 2013.
Grangemouth and the Forth Estuary. Southport, Merseyside: Café Royal Books, 2014.
Desert States: Photographs from New Mexico, Arizona, Utah and Nevada. Chronicles no. 6. Part of Chronicles set 2. Taipei: The Velvet Cell, 2014.
Chernobyl. Vol 1. Chronicles no. 13. Taipei: The Velvet Cell, 2014.
Chernobyl. Vol 2. Chronicles no. 14. Taipei: The Velvet Cell, 2014.
Sheffield: Things Seen whilst Wandering around Attercliffe. Southport, Merseyside: Café Royal Books, 2014.
Sheffield: The Remains of Some Buildings around the Don Valley. Southport, Merseyside: Café Royal Books, 2014.
Sheffield: In Transition. Southport, Merseyside: Café Royal Books, 2014.
The Dark River: Bolton — Farnworth. Southport, Merseyside: Café Royal Books, 2015. Edition of 150 copies.
The Dark River: Kearsley — Clifton. Southport, Merseyside: Café Royal Books, 2015. Edition of 150 copies.
The Dark River: Kearsley Power Station. Southport, Merseyside: Café Royal Books, 2016. Edition of 150 copies.
The Dark River: Clifton — Death Valley — Agecroft. Southport, Merseyside: Café Royal Books, 2016. Edition of 150 copies.
The Dark River: Agecroft — Salford. Southport, Merseyside: Café Royal Books, 2016. Edition of 150 copies. Some copies are accompanied by a separate essay by Paul Herrmann, "Reflections on Dark River."

Solo exhibitions
Cityscapes. Brewery Arts Centre, Kendal, Cumbria, 1984.
Landscapes. Stockport Art Gallery, Stockport, 1984.
Working Lives. Stockport Art Gallery, Stockport; Side Gallery, Newcastle upon Tyne, 1986. Bonnington Gallery, Trent Polytechnic, Nottingham, 1987.
The Big Ditch. Viewpoint Gallery, Salford, Manchester, 1986.
Regeneration. Untitled Gallery, Sheffield, 1989.
Borderland. Manor Gallery, Carlisle, Cumbria, 1989.
The Big Ditch. Blackburn Museum and Art Gallery, Blackburn; Merseyside Maritime Museum, Liverpool, 1990. Castle Park Arts Centre, Frodsham, Cheshire, 1991. Calderdale Industrial Museum, Halifax, Yorkshire; Manor Gallery, Carlisle, 1992. Williamson Art Gallery, Birkenhead, 1993. Duncan of Jordanstone Gallery, Dundee, 1994.
Jimmy Jock, Albert and the Six Sided Clock. Merseyside Maritime Museum, Liverpool. May–September 1993. Fotonoviembre, Centro de Fotografía Isla de Tenerife, 1995.
Scratching the Surface. Tullie House Museum and Art Gallery, Carlisle, 1994.
Workplace. Durham Art Gallery, Durham, 1996.
In Isolation. Euston railway station escalators, London, 1996.
Where it all began. Centro Colombo Americano, Medellín, Colombia, 1996.
By Association. Mill Gallery, Carlisle, 1997. Landscapes associated with nuclear testing and energy generation.
First and Last. Viewpoint Gallery, Salford, 1997. Rituals in Japan to commemorate the atomic bombs.
By Association. Folly Gallery, Lancaster; Tom Blau Gallery, London, 2001
Legacy. Tullie House Museum and Art Gallery, Carlisle, 2001.
Consequences. Gallery Oldham, 2002.
After Schwitters – Kurt Schwitters and the Merzbarn Conference. Cumbria, 2003.
h)arris. Installation sited at 15 rail stations along Cumbrian Coast Line, 2004.
A Black Dog Came Calling and Melancholy Objects. Institute of Psychiatry Gallery, King's College London. November 2005 – February 2006.
Committed to Memory. Tullie House Museum and Art Gallery, Carlisle. May–July 2007.
Working Lives. Stockport Art Gallery, February–March 2011. Darwell's photographs from 1985.
Dogs in Cages. Look 11 International Photography Festival, Confined. The Bluecoat, Liverpool, May–July 2011.
After Schwitters. Hatton Gallery, University of Newcastle. February–April 2013.

Public collections
 Victoria and Albert Museum, London
 King's College / Maudsley Hospital Trust, London
 British Film Institute, London
 Site Gallery, Sheffield
 National Media Museum / Sun Life Collection, Bradford
 Merseyside Maritime Museum, Liverpool
 Tullie House Museum and Art Gallery, Carlisle
 Manchester Art Gallery
 Arts Council North West, Manchester
 Stockport Art Gallery, Stockport
 Viewpoint Gallery, Salford
 Metropolitan Museum of Art, New York
 Centro de Fotografía Isla de Tenerife

Notes

References

Photographers from Cumbria
Photography in Ukraine
Alumni of Manchester Metropolitan University
Alumni of the University of Sunderland
Academics of the University of Cumbria
Living people
1955 births
People from Bolton